Banks and Politics in America (1957) is a book by Bray Hammond, which describes the differences in banking and politics in the United States between the American Revolution and the Civil War period. The book was awarded the 1958 Pulitzer Prize for History.

References

Further reading 
 
 
 

1957 non-fiction books
Books about politics of the United States
Books about economic history
History books about the American Revolution
History books about the American Civil War
Princeton University Press books
Pulitzer Prize for History-winning works